Anuvinda is a genus of spiders in the family Titanoecidae. It was first described in 1967 by Lehtinen. , it contains two Asian species.

References

Titanoecidae
Araneomorphae genera
Spiders of Asia
Taxa named by Pekka T. Lehtinen